Osvaldo Ramiro Fumazoni better known as Ramiro Fumazoni (born 22 December 1971), is an Argentine model and actor. Born in Buenos Aires, Argentina.

Filmography

Film

Television roles

References

External links 
 

1971 births
Living people
Argentine male television actors
21st-century Argentine male actors